Çataloluk is a village in Anamur district of Mersin Province, Turkey. It is situated in the Taurus Mountains. The population of Çataloluk is 427  as of 2011.

References

Villages in Anamur District